Cuyaguateje River is a river of southern Cuba.

See also
List of rivers of Cuba

Rivers of Cuba